Satendra Singh may refer to:

Satendra Singh (doctor), medical doctor at the University College of Medical Sciences, Delhi
Satendra Singh (politician), former Fijian politician